Félix Márquez (born 20 November 1947) is a Venezuelan boxer. He competed in the men's flyweight event at the 1968 Summer Olympics.

Professional boxing career
Marquez had a mostly undistinguished professional boxing career which included a record of 6 wins, 6 losses and 1 draw (tie) in 13 bouts, with 5 knockout wins and 3 knockout losses. His wins, however, included a sixth round knockout victory over future three time world champion Betulio Gonzalez on 6 March 1970 and his losses included a 12 rounds split decision defeat to that same fighter for the Venezuelan national flyweight title in a rematch, held on 5 June of the same year.

References

1947 births
Living people
Venezuelan male boxers
Olympic boxers of Venezuela
Boxers at the 1968 Summer Olympics
People from Cumaná
Flyweight boxers